The 1986 Air Canada Cup was Canada's eighth annual national midget 'AAA' hockey championship, which was played April 15–19, 1986 at the Moncton Coliseum in Moncton, New Brunswick.  The Notre Dame Hounds from Wilcox, Saskatchewan won their second national title, defeating the Toronto Redwings in the gold medal game.  The Gouverneurs de Ste-Foy won the bronze medal.  Future National Hockey League players competing in this tournament were Rod Brind'Amour, Scott Pellerin, Frederic Chabot, Michel Picard, Yves Racine, and most notably, future Hall of Famer Joe Sakic, who was a member of the Burnaby Hawks.

Teams

Round robin

Standings

Scores

Moncton 8 - Burnaby 5
Toronto 4 - St. John's 4
Notre Dame 3 - Ste-Foy 1
Toronto 6 - Moncton 2
Ste-Foy 11 - St. John's 2
Notre Dame 10 - Toronto 1
Ste-Foy 4 - Burnaby 1
Notre Dame 7 - Moncton 4
Burnaby 5 - St. John's 2
Ste-Foy 9 - Moncton 5
Toronto 6 - Burnaby 4
Ste-Foy 6 - Toronto 3
Notre Dame 9 - St. John's 3
St. John's 7 - Moncton 5
Notre Dame 4 - Burnaby 1

Playoffs

Semi-finals
Notre Dame 10 - St. John's 1
Toronto 7 - Ste- Foy 4

Bronze-medal game
Ste-Foy 7 - St. John's 6

Gold-medal game
Notre Dame 8 - Toronto 5

Individual awards
Most Valuable Player: Brent Bobyck (Notre Dame)
Top Scorer: Michel Picard (Ste-Foy)
Top Forward: Benoit Groulx (Ste-Foy)
Top Defenceman: Brent Bobyck (Notre Dame)
Top Goaltender: Frederic Chabot (Ste-Foy)
Most Sportsmanlike Player: Andrew McKim (Moncton)

See also
Telus Cup

References

External links
Telus Cup Website
Hockey Canada-Telus Cup Guide and Record Book

Telus Cup
Air Canada Cup
Sport in Moncton
April 1986 sports events in Canada
Ice hockey competitions in New Brunswick